Carl Vinson (November 18, 1883 – June 1, 1981) was an American politician who served in the U.S. House of Representatives for over 50 years and was influential in the 20th century expansion of the U.S. Navy. He was a member of the Democratic Party and represented Georgia in the House from 1914 to 1965. He was known as "The Father of the Two-Ocean Navy". He is the longest-serving member of the United States House of Representatives from the state of Georgia. From 1961 to 1965, he served as the Dean of the US House of Representatives as the longest serving member of the body.

, the third , is named after Vinson.

Early years
Vinson was born in Baldwin County, Georgia, where he attended local schools and Georgia Military College. He graduated with a law degree from Mercer University in 1902 and was a member of the Kappa Alpha Order. After some years of practice, he was elected to the Georgia House of Representatives in 1908. After losing a third term following redistricting, he was appointed as judge of the Baldwin County court.

Following the sudden death of US Senator Augustus Bacon, Representative Thomas W. Hardwick of Georgia's 10th congressional district was nominated to fill Bacon's Senate seat. Vinson announced his candidacy for Hardwick's seat in Congress. Vinson defeated three opponents. By this time, most of Georgia's African Americans had been disenfranchised since the turn of the century, after the state passed laws and a new constitution making voter registration more difficult. The Republican Party was hollowed out in the state. Vinson was the youngest member of Congress (30 years old) when he was sworn in on November 3, 1914.

Service in Congress

Vinson served as a Representative from November 3, 1914, to January 3, 1965. He was repeatedly re-elected by Democratic voters for this seat. During his tenure in the U.S. House, Vinson was a champion for national defense and especially the U.S. Navy and the U.S. Marine Corps. He joined the House Naval Affairs Committee shortly after World War I and became the ranking Democratic member in the early 1920s. He was the only Democrat appointed to the Morrow Board, which reviewed the status of aviation in America in the mid-1920s.

In 1931, Vinson became chairman of the House Naval Affairs Committee.  In 1934, Vinson helped push the Vinson–Trammell Act, along with Democratic Senator Park Trammell of Florida. The bill authorized the replacement of obsolete vessels by new construction and a gradual increase of ships within the limits of the Washington Naval Treaty of 1922 and London Naval Treaty of 1930. Initial funding for the Vinson–Trammell Navy Act was provided by the Emergency Appropriations Act of 1934. This was necessary as during the previous administration, not a single major warship was laid down and the US Navy was both aging and losing ground to the Japanese Navy. Japan repudiated the naval treaties in late 1934.

Vinson later was primarily responsible for additional naval expansion legislation, the Naval Act of 1938 ("Second Vinson Act") and the Third Vinson Act of 1940 (which was essentially a mere prelude to the Two-Oceans Act that followed a month later), as well as the Two-Ocean Navy Act of 1940. The ambitious program called for by this series of laws helped the U.S. Navy as the country entered World War II, as new ships were able to match the latest ships from Japan.

At the end of World War II, Congress had authorized four Naval four-star officers to be promoted to Fleet Admiral. A staunch partisan of Admiral William Halsey, Jr., Vinson blocked the nomination of Admiral Raymond A. Spruance several times, although the majority thought him more deserving, to ensure that Halsey got the fourth billet. Congress eventually responded by passing an unprecedented act that specified that Spruance would remain on a full admiral's pay once retired until his death.

Following World War II, the House Naval Affairs Committee was merged with the Military Affairs Committee to become the House Armed Services Committee (this consolidation mirrored the establishment of the Department of Defense when the old Departments of War and of the Navy were consolidated). With Republicans winning control of Congress in the 1946 election, Vinson served as ranking minority member of the committee for two years before becoming Chairman in early 1949, when the Democrats were again in majority. He held this position, with the exception of another two-year Republican interregnum in the early 1950s, until his retirement in 1965. In this role, Vinson adopted a committee rule that came to be known as the "Vinson rule", which limited the number of questions a junior member of the committee could ask to one question per year of service on the committee. As chairman, Vinson oversaw the modernization of the military as its focus shifted to the Cold War.

A staunch segregationist, in 1956, Vinson signed "The Southern Manifesto". Other Southern politicians signed this in resistance to the ruling by the United States Supreme Court in Brown v. Board of Education (1954) that segregated public education was unconstitutional, and that states needed to integrate their public schools.

Vinson did not seek re-election in 1964 and retired from Congress in January 1965.

Personal life
Vinson married Mary Green of Ohio in 1921. She died in 1949 after a long illness.

Vinson did not have children, but his great-nephew, Sam Nunn, served as a Senator from Georgia for more than 24 years. Nunn followed in his great uncle's footsteps, serving on the Senate Armed Services Committee for nearly his entire tenure in the Senate. Sam Nunn's daughter, Michelle Nunn ran unsuccessfully for one of Georgia's U.S. Senate seats in 2014.

Vinson considered his longtime assistant Charles Tillman Snead, Jr. his surrogate son, and Snead's wife, Molly Staeman Snead, was Vinson's wife's nurse for 34 years. Snead's son and grandchildren maintained this familial bond to Vinson until his death in 1981.

Death

Vinson returned to Baldwin County, Georgia, where he lived in retirement until his death on June 1, 1981. He is buried in Memory Hill Cemetery in Milledgeville, Georgia.

At the time of his death, Vinson was the last living member of the House of Representatives who was serving at the time of the United States' declaration of war against the German Empire, which precipitated the United States' entry into World War I.

Legacy 
On March 15, 1980, at age 96, he attended the ship's launching.

Vinson Massif, Antarctica's highest mountain, is also named after him, together with the related Mount Vinson and Vinson Plateau.

Carl Vinson served 26 consecutive terms in the U.S. House, rarely running against significant opposition. He served for 50 years and one month, a record that stood until 1992, when the mark was surpassed by Jamie L. Whitten of Mississippi.

For his commitment, Vinson was awarded the prestigious Sylvanus Thayer Award by the United States Military Academy. In 1964, President Lyndon Johnson awarded Vinson the Presidential Medal of Freedom with Special Distinction, the highest award the President can give to a civilian. During his own tenure in the House, Johnson had served for years as a junior member of the House Naval Affairs Committee under Vinson.

The Department of Veterans' Affairs Medical Center in Dublin, Georgia, serving veterans in Central and Southern Georgia, is named for Vinson.

The University of Georgia hosts the Carl Vinson Institute of Government.

Athens, Georgia, is the site of Carl Vinson Park.

Carl Vinson Parkway is located in Warner Robins, Georgia.

Georgia Military College formerly had a barracks named for him. It was razed in the mid-2000s.

Vinson Hall Retirement Community in McLean, Virginia, is named after Carl Vinson.

References

Bibliography

External links
 University of Georgia brief biography
 University of Georgia Profile of Carl Vinson
 Congressional Biography
  United States Navy website:  USS Carl Vinson
 Vinson Institute Press, "Carl Vinson: A Legacy of Public Service", 2002

|-

|-

1883 births
1981 deaths
American segregationists
Democratic Party members of the Georgia House of Representatives
Burials in Georgia (U.S. state)
Georgia (U.S. state) state court judges
Presidential Medal of Freedom recipients
Mercer University alumni
Burials at Memory Hill Cemetery
Democratic Party members of the United States House of Representatives from Georgia (U.S. state)
20th-century American judges
Deans of the United States House of Representatives
20th-century American politicians